Kelleher is an anglicized spelling of the Irish surname derived from Ó Céileachair, meaning "descendant of Céileachar"; Céileachar as a personal name means "spouse-loving", "companion dear", or "lover of company". Other anglicized spellings include "Kelliher", "Kellegher" and "Keller".

People with the surname
 Billy Kelleher (born 1968), Irish politician
 Benjamin Kelleher, New Zealand born Australian combat sports fighter
 Byron Kelleher, New Zealand rugby player
 Caoimhín Kelleher, Irish footballer
 Dermot P. Kelleher, Irish medical doctor and researcher; Dean of the Faculty of Medicine at Imperial College London
 Garrett Kelleher, Irish real estate developer
 Harry Kelleher, English cricketer
 Herb Kelleher (1931–2019), American lawyer and entrepreneur; co-founder of Southwest Airlines
 Humphrey Kelleher, Irish Gaelic footballer
 James Kelleher, Canadian lawyer and politician
 John Kelleher  (1893–1960), American baseball player and coach
 Martin Kelleher, Irish-American musician; member of the band Four to the Bar
 Michael Kelleher, American poet
 Mick Kelleher, American baseball player
 Paul Kelleher, British theatre producer and criminal
 Robbie Kelleher, Irish Gaelic footballer
 Robert J. Kelleher, American judge and tennis player
 Robert Kelleher, American politician
 Stephen Kelleher (1875–1917), Irish mathematician
 Tim Kelleher (actor), American actor
 Tim Kelleher (musician) (born 1980), American musician
 Tom Kelleher (Irish republican), Irish Republic Army member
 Victor Kelleher, Australian author
 Walter Kelleher,  An American born photographer from Bay Ridge, Brooklyn.

Others
 Kelleher International, professional matchmaking service that caters to high-net-worth individuals and celebrities

References

Surnames of Irish origin
Anglicised Irish-language surnames